Samantha Libreri (born 13 October 1982) is an Irish journalist.

Early life
Libreri was born in Dublin in 1983 and grew up in Finglas. Her surname is from a Maltese great-grandfather.

She attended University College Dublin, where she edited The University Observer and received a B.A. in English and Sociology.

Career

As a student, Libreri began working as a news assistant for RTÉ in 2000. In 2004 she won six Smedias (National Student Media Awards). In 2005, she was hired as a journalist for RTÉ.

In 2012 she wrote a book about the people of Finglas: Finglas: A People's Portrait, with photographs by Darren Kinsella.

Personal life
Libreri is a lifelong fan of Shamrock Rovers F.C.

Libreri is married to Niall Colman. She gave birth to her first child at the end of 2013, a son. She later had a daughter. They live in Clontarf, Dublin.

In 2016, she and her husband were sued by a Bulgarian ex-nanny.

References

1982 births
Living people
RTÉ newsreaders and journalists
21st-century Irish journalists
People from Finglas
Irish people of Maltese descent
Irish women journalists
Alumni of University College Dublin